Silivașu de Câmpie is a commune in Bistrița-Năsăud County, Transylvania, Romania. It is composed of four villages: Draga (Drágatanya), Fânațele Silivașului (Bircágtanya), Porumbenii (Jobojtanya) and Silivașu de Câmpie.

References

Communes in Bistrița-Năsăud County
Localities in Transylvania